Angel Blade is a 2002 erotic thriller film directed by David Heavener and starring David Heavener, Marc Singer and Amanda Righetti.

External links
 

2002 films
2000s erotic thriller films
American erotic thriller films
2000s English-language films
2000s American films